Inquisitor interrupta is a species of sea snail, a marine gastropod mollusk in the family Pseudomelatomidae, the turrids and allies.

Description
The length of the shell attains 30 mm.

The shell is sharply turreted, longitudinally ribbed and spirally striated. It is yellowish brown, the ribs reddish brown.

Distribution
This marine species occurs off Japan.

References

 Liu J.Y. [Ruiyu] (ed.). (2008). Checklist of marine biota of China seas. China Science Press. 1267 pp.

External links
 Gastropods.com: Inquisitor interrupta
 

interrupta
Gastropods described in 1816